Polytechnic School, often referred to simply as Poly, is a college preparatory private day school located in Pasadena, California with approximately 850 students enrolled in grades Kindergarten through 12.

The school is a former member of the G20 Schools group.

History 
The school was founded in 1907 as the first non-profit, independent school in Southern California.  It descends from the Throop Polytechnic Institute founded by Amos G. Throop, the same institution that grew into the present California Institute of Technology.

In the spring of 1907, the Institute decided to focus on the college level and closed the grammar school. Citrus tycoon and noted eugenicist Ezra S. Gosney donated $12,500, a sum matched by twelve other donors.  This money allowed them to purchase the property at the present site, originally an orange grove.  The school opened in October 1907 with 106 students.  At the time, the school was named Polytechnic Elementary School.  The school added a ninth grade in 1918 and expanded to high school in 1959. Polytechnic ended its pre-kindergarten program in 2005.

Academics 
Poly is recognized for its rigorous academic curriculum, which includes Advanced Placement and Honors classes as well as arts and athletic programs. The school has received numerous accolades for the academic accomplishments of its students. In 2006, Poly was named a world leader in student participation and performance on Advanced Placement exams by the College Board. The school frequently had the highest percentage of its students receive a 3 or above on the AP Calculus AB examination when compared to all other small schools administering the test across the globe, according to the College Board.

In recent years, the most popular college destination for Poly students was the University of Southern California. The Wall Street Journal ranked Poly 4th in the world as a feeder school for "elite colleges," including Harvard University, Princeton University, Massachusetts Institute of Technology, Williams College, Pomona College, Swarthmore College, the University of Chicago and Johns Hopkins University. In the 2016-17 class, 35% of the class were National Merit Semi-Finalists & Commended students and 80% of students were accepted to 'highly-selective' top tier universities (institutions with an admit rate of 30% or lower).

Los Angeles Magazine has also consistently recognized Poly as one of the best high schools in Los Angeles. The September 2008 issue praised Poly for its "national reputation for producing scholars, artists and athletes." Using test score data, the September 2014 issue of Los Angeles Magazine ranked Poly 2nd of 75 Los Angeles high schools. With an average score of 2150, Poly students had the highest average SAT score of any school included in the rankings. The Washington Post ranked Poly the 84th most challenging high school in the United States in 2017. In their 2022 evaluations, Niche ranked Poly as the 3rd best private high school in Los Angeles, the 9th best private high school in California, and the 36th best private high school nationally.

Campus 
Polytechnic School covers 15 acres and is divided by Cornell Road into two campuses, north (Lower and Middle School) and south (Upper School), and is adjacent to the Caltech campus. Most of the North Campus buildings were designed by Myron Hunt, who also designed the Rose Bowl and The Huntington, and Elmer Gray, who designed the Beverly Hills Hotel and the Pasadena Playhouse. Some of the classrooms on the lower campus were also done by Gordon Kaufmann, and Roland Coate. The Cornett Mansion (now called the Haaga House) in the south campus was designed in 1907 and serves as the administration building and houses several classrooms for the Upper School. Facilities include a Lower and Middle School Library, Upper School Library, Pool, Boys and Girls Gyms, Athletic field, Performing Arts Center, and historic as well as new classrooms.

Athletics 
Poly's Athletic Department currently offers 25 Varsity sports in the three seasons of play and is a member of the Prep League. Poly has been competing in the California Interscholastic Federation (CIF) since 1962. In 2016–17, 82% of the students in the Upper School participated in some type of sport.

The CIF Southern Section has recognized Poly for its commitment to sportsmanship and awarded Poly the CIF Southern Section Jim Staunton Champions of Character Award in 2012. Poly was named the ESPN Rise California/Cal-Hi Sport's Division 5 School of the Year in 2011.

CIF-SS Team Championships (38)
 Football (2) - 1999, 2002
 Baseball (2) - 2011, 2018
 Boys Basketball (5) - 1978, 1979, 1984, 1995, 2021
 Girls Basketball (2) - 1992, 2011
 Girls Cross Country (2) - 1994, 1997
 Boys Soccer (1) - 2000
 Girls Soccer (8) - 1991, 1992, 1993, 1994, 2001, 2002, 2003, 2013*
 Girls Swimming (2) - 2015, 2016
 Boys Tennis (3) - 1989, 1991, 1992
 Girls Tennis (5) - 1992, 1993, 1994, 1997, 2014
 Girls Track & Field (2) - 1999, 2001
 Girls Volleyball (2) - 1997, 1998
 Boys Water Polo (1) - 2012
 Girls Water Polo (2) - 2015, 2017
 CIF-State Southern California Regional Championship

CIF-SS Individual Championships (69)
 Boys Cross Country (2*)
 Girls Cross Country (1)
 Boys Swimming & Diving (23**)
 Girls Swimming & Diving (27**)
 Boys Track & Field (1)
 Girls Track & Field (15)
 CIF-SS & CIF-State Championships
 CIF-SS & CIF-Masters Championships

Notable alumni 
 Olugbenga Ajilore, economist
 Ini Archibong, designer
 Koko Archibong, former professional and Olympic basketball player
 Sean Bailey, television and film producer
 John Battelle, author, journalist, and co-founder of Wired magazine
 Alec Berg, screenwriter, actor, and film producer
 Bruce Beutler, 2011 Nobel Laureate in Medicine
 Otis Booth, billionaire investor and philanthropist
 Stephen J. Cannell, television producer and creator of 21 Jump Street, The A-Team, and Silk Stalkings
 Otis Chandler, publisher, The Los Angeles Times
 Julia Child, television chef and personality
 Anna Christy, soprano opera singer
 Steve Cohen, member of the United States House of Representatives representing Tennessee's ninth district
 Keegan de Lancie, actor
 Harriet Huntington Doerr, author
 Rebecca Eaton, television producer
 David Ebershoff author of the international bestselling novels, The 19th Wife, The Danish Girl and Pasadena, and Executive Editor at Random House
 Kevin Greutert, film director and editor of the SAW series
 Ted Griffin, screenwriter, actor, and film producer
 Michael Grimes, managing director and Head of Global Technology Investment Banking at Morgan Stanley
 R. Stanton Hales, former president of the College of Wooster
 Howard Hawks, director
 James C. Ho, United States circuit judge of the United States Court of Appeals for the Fifth Circuit
 Leondra Kruger, Supreme Court of California Associate Justice and potential Supreme Court pick by President Joe Biden
 Macky Makisumi, speedcuber
 F.O. Matthiessen, Harvard professor, literary critic and author of American Renaissance: Art and Expression in the Age of Emerson and Whitman 
 Randall Miller, director, screenwriter, producer, actor
 Charlie Paddock, American athlete, Olympic champion
 Drew Pinsky, physician, radio and television personality
 Rob Rasmussen, retired Toronto Blue Jays pitcher
 Arthur Emmons Raymond, Aeronautical Engineer
 Kristina Reed, film producer for DreamWorks Animation and Walt Disney Animation Studios
 George Reeves, actor, star of Adventures of Superman
 Coleman Shelton, center for the Los Angeles Rams 
 Alison Sweeney, actress
 Mike White, film director, screenwriter, and actor
 David Wiseman, sculptor

References

External links 
 

1907 establishments in California
Education in Pasadena, California
Educational institutions established in 1907
High schools in Los Angeles County, California
Myron Hunt buildings
Preparatory schools in California
Private K-12 schools in Los Angeles County, California